The Battle of Kushtia can refer to two incidents during the Bangladesh Liberation War, both of which happened in what is now Bangladesh:

A battle on 19 April 1971 between East Bengali rebels and Pakistani forces.
An Indian attack from West Bengal into East Pakistan during the Bangladesh Liberation War.

See also
 Timeline of the Bangladesh Liberation War
 Military plans of the Bangladesh Liberation War
 Mitro Bahini order of battle
 Pakistan Army order of battle, December 1971
 Evolution of Pakistan Eastern Command plan
 1971 Bangladesh genocide
 Operation Searchlight
 Indo-Pakistani wars and conflicts

References 

Kushtia
1971 in Bangladesh